Antonio Vargas Quijada (born 3 December 1958), commonly known as Biri, is a Spanish retired footballer who played as a midfielder.

Club career
Born in San Roque, Biri nicknamed Viriato, after the ancient leader of the Lusitanians. After watching Biri Biri play for Sevilla FC, he decided he would grow his hair in to a long afro to match his idol. He would wear a wig while the hair was growing, which he later sold. He changed his nickname from Viri to Biri and followed in his idol's footsteps by signing for Sevilla in 1979, but only managed 15 appearances, before returning to the lower Spanish divisions.

References

External links

1959 births
Living people
Spanish footballers
Footballers from San Roque, Cádiz
Association football midfielders
La Liga players
Segunda División players
Segunda División B players
Tercera División players
Algeciras CF footballers
Sevilla FC players
Cartagena FC players
Levante UD footballers
UD Melilla footballers
CD Olímpic de Xàtiva footballers
Spain youth international footballers
Spain under-21 international footballers